"The Party" is a song by Australian pop-rock group Uncanny X-Men. The song was released in February 1985 as the lead single from the band's debut studio album, 'Cos Life Hurts. It peaked at number 18 on the Kent Music Report, becoming the group's first top 20 single.

Track listing 
7" Vinyl/12" Vinyl (Mushroom – K-9579/X 13198)
 "The Party" 
 "The Slug"

Charts

References

1985 singles
Uncanny X-Men (band) songs
Mushroom Records singles